Gafsa Archaeological Museum is an archaeological museum in Gafsa, Tunisia. It sits in the old city center. Opposite the museum are ancient Roman pools.

History of Gafsa
A large section of the museum is dedicated to the period of history of Gafsa when it was under Roman control. Gafsa was once a Roman frontier town, the headquarters of a garrison. A high-ranking military chief would usually be in command of the garrison and resided in Gafsa. Articles used in everyday life, like jewellery, coins, sculptures and mosaics, are part of this collection. One ostonef the best artifacts is the mosaic pavement that shows a circus game. It dates from the 4th century AD.

Exhibits

The Gafsa Museum has an extensive collection of prehistoric flint and lithic tools as well as other tools fashioned out of bone. Objects depicting human and animal figures and paraphernalia suggesting spiritual life are also part of the museum collection. The museum houses not only artifacts from the city but also from the surrounding areas. One of the museum's most prized assets is a Capsian figurine dating back to 8000 BC. This indicates that Gafsa, after which the Capsian culture was named, has been inhabited since the Mesolithic epoch.

See also

African archaeology
Culture of Tunisia
List of museums in Tunisia

References

Museums with year of establishment missing
Archaeological museums in Tunisia
Gafsa Governorate